Lane Bess (born September 18, 1961) is a venture capitalist known for his work in technology. He has served as principal and founder of family fund Bess Ventures and Advisory, LLC, a strategic management, investment and marketing services firm, since February 2015.

Early life and education
Bess was born in Neptune City, New Jersey and graduated from Ocean Township High School in 1979.

In 1983, Bess received a Bachelor of Science degree in Managerial Economics from Carnegie Mellon University, then went on to receive an MBA degree from University of Dayton. Bess has served as a Trustee of Carnegie Mellon University since June 2019. In the same year, Bess and his wife Letty donated $10 million to Carnegie Mellon University to endow the dean's chair for the Dietrich College of Humanities and Social Sciences.

Career
Early in his career, Bess held senior sales and marketing positions at NCR Corporation, where he oversaw multinational global sales. Then he went on to AT&T, where he was responsible for the product launches of AT&T's business and consumer internet services in the mid-1990s.

From 2002 to 2008, Bess served as Executive Vice President of Worldwide Sales and General Manager of Trend Micro. In 2008, he became president and CEO of Palo Alto Networks, where he served until 2011, leading late fundraising and taking the company to its Initial public offering. From 2011 to 2015, Bess was the COO of Zscaler, a company focused on cloud-based internet security services.

Bess serves on the boards of several companies, including Deep Instinct, eSentire, TrueFort, ZeroFOX, PLUM (SPAC).

In March 2015, Bess founded Bess Ventures and Advisory, where he serves as founder and principal. Some well-known investments of Bess Ventures and Advisory include Arista Networks, Nutanix, ThoughtSpot, Rubrik and Zscaler.

Spaceflight 
On November 23, 2021, it was announced that Bess would fly into space aboard Blue Origin NS-19. The flight took place December 11, 2021.

Personal life
Bess lives in Miami Beach, Florida with his wife Letty. His son Cameron Bess accompanied him to space aboard Blue Origin NS-19, making them the first parent-child pair to fly to space together.

References

1961 births
Living people
American financial businesspeople
Carnegie Mellon University alumni
University of Dayton alumni
American venture capitalists
Ocean Township High School alumni
People from Neptune City, New Jersey
Commercial astronauts
New Shepard astronauts
New Shepard passengers
People who have flown in suborbital spaceflight